What the may refer to:
 What The--?!, a Marvel Comics comic book series self-parodying the Marvel Universe
 What The..., a 2013 album by Black Flag

See also
 What the Hack
 What the Health
 What the Heck (disambiguation)
 What the Hell (disambiguation)
 What the fuck (disambiguation)